The Mitsubishi Heavy Industries Crystal Mover C810A is an automated people mover vehicle  which serves the Sengkang LRT line and Punggol LRT line as the second generation train after their previous counterparts Mitsubishi Heavy Industries Crystal Mover C810. Two train sets commenced revenue service on 5 April 2016, with Set 43 and 44 running on the East and West loop of the Sengkang LRT line respectively. Since then, the rest of the fleet progressively entered service.

Train design
There is little difference between its older counterpart, the C810. However, its headlights are vertical instead of horizontal and luminously white instead of yellow installed on its predecessor. Its train number is underlined.

Its interior design bear little difference compared to its older counterparts, one being that the LCD screen font is smaller and shows green messages (e.g.: Welcome to SBS Transit) instead of yellow-green in its older counterparts.

As the carriages are closed-end, the train must be stationary and the doors must be open for passengers to move between carriages during 2-car operations.

Train formation
The configuration of a C810A in revenue service is just the one car. With both the motors and the third rail current collectors, the train cars can be coupled up to 2 cars during service.

The car numbers of the trains range from 42 to 57. Individual cars are assigned a two-digit serial number by the rail operator SBS Transit. A trainset consists of one motor car, e.g. set 42 is car 42. Both digits identify the car number.
 Mitsubishi Heavy Industries built sets 42–57.

The serial numbers given are underlined, indicating they have the new signalling system.

References

Crystal Mover people movers
750 V DC multiple units
Light Rail Transit (Singapore) rolling stock